The bilateral relation between Nepal and China is defined by the Sino-Nepalese Treaty of Peace and Friendship signed on April 28, 1960, by the two countries. Though initially unenthusiastic, Nepal has been of late making efforts to increase trade and connectivity with China. Relations between Nepal and China got a boost when both countries solved all border disputes along the China–Nepal border by signing the Sino-Nepal boundary agreement on March 21, 1960, making Nepal the first neighboring country of  China to agree to and ratify a border treaty with China. The government of both Nepal and China ratified the border agreement treaty on October 5, 1961. From 1975 onward, Nepal has maintained a policy of balancing the competing influence of China and Nepal's southern neighbor India, the only two neighbors of the Himalayan country after the accession of the Kingdom of Sikkim into India in 1975. 

In recent years, China has been making an effort to gain entry into South Asian Association for Regional Cooperation (SAARC), and, Nepal has continuously backed and supported the proposal to include China as a member in the regional grouping. Since 1975, Sino-Nepalese relations have been close and grown significantly, though India remains the largest source of total Foreign direct investment (FDI) (China has been the largest source of FDI to Nepal from 2015 onwards), and the third largest source of remittance to Nepal after Qatar and UAE. Based on the amount of remittance to Nepal sent by Nepalese migrants working in India (amounting to nearly $1.021 billion per year), the government of Nepal estimate that there are around 1 million Nepalese migrant workers in India as of 2021, while the number of Nepalis in China is minuscule (3,500 in Mainland and 15,950 in Hong Kong) as of 2017.

Nepal, Tibet and China

  The relationship between Nepal and Tibet are centuries old, with the Sherpa people, the Gurung people and the Thakali people of Nepal sharing close linguistic, cultural, marital, and, ethnic ties with the Tibetan people of Tibet. 

Around 600–650 CE, Nepalese Princess Bhrikuti (Bal-mo-bza' Khri-btsun in Tibetan) married Songtsän Gampo, the earliest known Emperor of Tibet. Princess Bhrikuti, as a part of her dowry, is widely believed to have brought Buddhists relics and Thangkas to Tibet, and therefore, is attributed for establishing Buddhism as the Royal religion in Tibet. Bhrikuti is usually represented as Green Tara in Tibetan iconography. The Red Palace (Mar-po-ri Pho-drang) on Marpo Ri (Red Mountain) in Lhasa, which was later rebuilt into the thirteen storey Potala Palace by the Fifth Dalai Lama, was constructed by Newari craftsmen according to her wishes, who came to Tibet from Kathmandu with her, as a part of her dowry. She also instructed her craftsmen to construct the Tub-wang and other statues in Samye, the first Buddhist gompa in Tibet. One of her craftsmen, Thro-wo, also carved the revered statue of Chenresig (Avalokiteshvara), Thungji Chen-po rang-jung nga-ldan.

During the Tang dynasty, the Chinese envoy Wang Xuance led an army of Nepalese and Tibetans to defeat an usurper in the Indian Kingdom of Magadha. In 1260 CE during the Yuan dynasty, Nepali craftsmen Araniko, on the decree of Chinese/Mongolian Emperor Kublai Khan, traveled to Shangdu and built the White Stupa of Miaoying Temple in Beijing, which was the largest structure in Beijing at that time. Taking almost ten years (1279-1288 CE) to complete, the Stupa better known as White Dagoba, is still standing today and is considered to be one of the oldest Buddhist Stupa in China.

In 1789, the Tibetan government stopped the usage of Nepalese coins for trade in Tibet, citing purity concerns over the copper and the silver coins minted by the Nepalese government, which led to the first Tibet-Nepal War. A resounding victory of Gorkha forces over Tibetans in the first Tibet-Nepal War left the Lhasa Durbar with no choice but to ask for assistance from the Qing Emperor in Peking which led to the first Sino-Nepalese War. In the immediate aftermath of the Sino-Nepalese War (1789–1792), Nepal was forced to sign the 'Treaty of Betrawati' which stipulated that the Government of Nepal was required to make payment of tribute to Qing court in Peking once every five years, after the defeat of Gurkha forces by the Qing army in Tibet.

The 'Treaty of Betrawati' signed by Nepal and Tibet on October 2, 1792, stipulated that both Nepal and Tibet recognize the suzerainty of the Qing Emperor Jiaqing, and further, stated that the Qing court would be obliged to help Nepal defend against any external aggression. However, during the Anglo-Nepalese War (1814–16), the Qing Emperor refused the Nepalese government's request to provide support to Nepalese forces, and, the latter's defeat led to the establishment of the British Empire in India. Then after, Nepal initiated a policy of balancing the influence of Imperial China and British India. Through the tenth quinquennial mission to China (1837), under the leadership of Chautariya Pushkar Shah, the Nepalese government again requested the Daoguang Emperor court to either send troops or a subsidy of Twenty million rupees to oppose the British. However, the Nepalese delegation was said to have been met with a stern refusal of its petition for monetary support, and instructed by the Qing court to stop further hostilities against the British. Soon after Nepal's defeat in the Anglo-Nepalese war, from 1840 onward, Tibetan government again stopped the use Nepalese coins for trade. In an attempt to preserve the lucrative coin export business and trade advantages, the Nepalese Kingdom, under the leadership of Jung Bahadur Rana again invaded Tibet in 1855 during the second Nepalese-Tibetan War, and raided the Tashilhunpo Monastery in Shigatse, home to the Panchen Lama at that time. The invading Nepalese army was ordered to vacate the occupied Tibetan territories by the Qing Court, which was rapidly losing its hold over frontier territories due to turmoil inside China proper. Nepal's refusal to hand back the control of Tashilhunpo Monastery led to the second Sino-Nepalese War which resulted in a stalemate; a major setback for Tibetans, ultimately culminating into the Treaty of Thapathali on March 24, 1856. Through the Treaty of Thapathali, Nepal expressed commitment to help Tibet in the event of foreign aggression while authorities in Tibet were obliged to pay the Nepalese government a sum of Nepalese Rupees 10,000 every year. Further, Nepalese government stopped paying tribute to the rulers in Beijing after signing the Treaty of Thapathali. The withdrawal of Nepalese forces from Tibetan areas adjacent to Tibet-Nepal border in 1856 provided the Qing court with the opportunity to firmly tighten its grip in and around Lhasa and throughout Tibet. Soon after the Treaty of Thapathali, the Qing court also issued an edict which among other dispositions stipulated the introduction of a new silver coinage in Tibet, struck in the name of the Qianlong Emperor, the then ruler of China, while at the same time, Nepalese coins were completely forbidden in Tibet from then onward.

During the late 19th century (1899-1901), after the destabilization of Qing Imperial Court due to Boxer Rebellion, the British Raj as the unchallenged and the dominant power in the sub-continent exerted total control over China's frontier regions including Nepal. Left with no support from the weakened Qing Court, in the immediate aftermath of Qing Empire's defeat at the hands of 8-nation alliance, Nepal aligned itself with the British Raj in India and supported the British expedition to Tibet. When China sought to claim Tibet in 1910, Nepal sided with Tibet and Britain and broke relations with China after Tibet drove Chinese forces out in 1911.

The people-to-people ties between Nepali and Tibetan groups has been affected since 1950, after the annexation of Tibet by the People's Republic of China resulting in the regulated border between Nepal and Tibet (as a part of China). Despite the fluctuating political scenarios in Nepal's neighborhood and within Nepal itself, the influence of Buddhism still remains strong in the day-to-day life of Nepalese people living in the Himalayan Region. The Buddhist monarchy in The Kingdom of Lo (Upper Mustang), previously a part of the Tibetan Empire but now in Nepal, was terminated only in 2008. The area of Lo Manthang, however, still remains quasi-restricted to foreigners.

Diplomatic relations and Nepalese neutrality

Nepal was historically influenced by India, including the period 1842 to 1945, when its international relations were under Indo-British control. As the strength of the People's Republic of China grew, Nepal developed greater room for diplomatic maneuver.

However, the 1950 military occupation of Tibet by the People's Liberation Army raised significant concerns of security and territorial integrity in Nepal, drawing Nepal into a close relationship with extensive economic and military ties with Republic of India. China ordered restrictions on the entry of Nepalese pilgrims and contacts with Tibet. The 1950 Indo-Nepal Treaty of Peace and Friendship that had established a close Indo-Nepalese relationship on commerce, and foreign relations, was increasingly resented in Nepal, which began seeing it as an encroachment of its sovereignty and an unwelcome extension of Indian influence; the deployment of an Indian military mission in Nepal in the 1950s and unabated migration of millions of bihari Indians into Nepal's Terai region increased these concerns.

In 1955, Nepal restored diplomatic relations with the People's Republic of China and exchanged resident ambassadors by 1960. In 1956, both nations signed a new treaty terminating the Treaty of Thapathali of 1856 and Nepal recognized Tibet as a part of China. In 1960, Nepal and China signed a boundary settlement agreement and a separate 'Sino-Nepal Treaty of Peace and Friendship'. Nepal also began supporting the change of China's seat in the United Nations. In 1961, Nepal and China agreed to build an all-weather road connecting the Nepalese capital Kathmandu with Tibet. 

In December 1960, Nepali King Mahendra executed a coup and dismissed the parliamentary government of Nepal. India supported the deposed parliamentary government, and blockaded Nepal in fall 1962. Soon afterwards, the Sino-Indian war broke out, and Indian losses to China made it unwilling to risk further confrontation with Nepal; India lifted the blockade.

From the early 1960s until 1973, the United States Central Intelligence Agency trained and financed Tibetan guerillas operating in opposition to China from two districts in Nepal. The United States ended its support for these guerillas following the 1972 visit by Richard Nixon to China, and Nepal under King Birendra suppressed the guerillas.

Economic and strategic relations
In the late 1970s after the accession of Kingdom of Sikkim by India, King Birendra proposed Nepal as a "zone of peace" between India and China and in the 1980s, Nepal began importing Chinese weaponry. When the United States, United Kingdom and India refused to supply arms to the regime of King Gyanendra of Nepal, who had assumed direct rule to suppress the Maoist insurgency during the Nepalese civil war (1996–2006), China responded by dispatching arms to Nepal, in spite of the ideological affinity of the Maoists with China. After the peace process and national elections in Nepal in 2008, the new Maoist-led government announced its intentions to scrap Nepal's 1950 treaty with India, indicating a stronger move towards closer ties with China.

Nepal strongly supported China's successful 2007 application as an observer to SAARC. 

Nepal has been a major beneficiary of China's increased focus on developing southwest China, and Nepal-China trade increased by a factor of five from 2009 to 2012. Nepal has been a beneficiary of increased Chinese foreign aid to south Asia since the mid-2000s, including Chinese financing for a railway from Kathmandu to Lhasa. In 2021, the China International Development Cooperation Agency pledged to finance development projects in fifteen northern district of Nepal through the "Northern Region Border Development Programme".

Transportation

The Araniko Highway was built in the 1960s with help from the Chinese on an older yak track. They also planned to expand the road in 2012, but keeping the route open was made more difficult by landslides from monsoons. The road became a conduit for a large amount of trade between China and Nepal, and also for some trade between India and China when it is open.

In 2007–08, China began construction of a 770-kilometre railway connecting the Tibetan capital of Lhasa with the Nepalese border town of Khasa, connecting Nepal to China's wider national railway network. In a meeting between Chinese and Nepalese officials on 25 April 2008, the Chinese delegation announced the intention to extend the Qingzang railway to Zhangmu (Nepali: Khasa) on the Nepalese border. Nepal had requested that the railway be extended to enable trade and tourism between the two nations. On the occasion of the Nepali premier's visit to China it was reported that construction will be completed by 2020. The section Lhasa-Shigatse opened in August 2014.

An air route exists between Lhasa and Kathmandu.

In June 2018, China and Nepal announced an agreement to connect Xigazê, Tibet Autonomous Region with Kathmandu, via a new railroad.

In September 2018, Nepalese commerce ministry official Rabi Shankar Sainju announced that China had granted Nepal access to the ports of Tianjin, Shenzhen, Lianyungang, and Zhanjiang, as well as land ports at Lanzhou, Lhasa and Xigatse. Access to Chinese ports reduces Nepal's dependence on India for commerce, a dependence that was highlighted by the 2015 Nepal blockade.

Territorial disputes
According to Indian media sources, claims by China on Nepalese territory were first made in 1930 when Mao Zedong declared in the original version of The Chinese Revolution and the Communist Party, that "the correct boundaries of China would include Ladakh, Burma, Kingdom of Bhutan, Kingdom of Sikkim, and Republic of Nepal". He also postulated in his Five Fingers of Tibet policy that Tibet, which he claimed was an integral part of China, was like his right palm and Ladakh, Nepal, Sikkim, Bhutan and South Tibet (originally NEFA, later renamed as Arunachal Pradesh) the five fingers attached to that palm.

In November 2019 after Nepal's parliament formally approved a map depicting Kalapani within Nepal, per Indian media sources Nepal's Survey Department reported of Chinese encroachment on 36 hectares in four districts of Nepal (Sankhuwasabha, Rasuwa, Sindhupalchowk and Humla) and that there was a further risk of losing several hundred hectares of land.
Indian media sources also reported that Nepal Agriculture department's documented massive road development projects in the Tibet Autonomous Region that have caused Sumjung, Kam Khola and Arun rivers to change their course and expand China's boundary into northern territories of Nepal, and warned that even more Nepalese land would be encroached by the Chinese if the rivers continue to change course. Nepalese government later on officially released a statement stating, "Why would the Agriculture department release report related to the boundaries of Nepal?"  Indian media sources also said that China could set up Border Observation Post of Armed Police in these encroached territories.
In May 2020, Chinese media, calling Mount Everest (known in Nepal as Sagarmatha) as Mount Qomolangma claimed it as part of Chinese territory, sparking outrage among Nepalese citizens. In 1961, King Mahendra, the then ruler of Nepal, had announced that Mount Everest falls squarely inside Nepal. Opposition leaders have criticized Prime Minister Oli for not raising up the Sino-Nepal border issue.

In September 2020, Nepalese media reported that a border pillar in Humla District of Nepal was missing and China had constructed 11 buildings 2 kilometers inside Nepalese territory. This was supported by Deputy CDO of Humla and Provincial MLA Jeevan Bahadur Shahi who collected proofs by making days long visit and let them to public. He got warning and threat from Chinese side in return. When the Chief District Officer of Nepal went to inspect the place based on concerns raised by locals, he was told by Chinese security officials that the buildings were within Chinese territory which extends one kilometre further south from where the buildings are located.

Human rights
In June 2020, Nepal was one of 53 countries that backed the Hong Kong national security law at the United Nations.

Treaties
Nepal and China have signed a transit trade treaty and nine other pacts as of 22 of March 2016.

Points in Nepal-China Treaty 2016:
 Nepal to use China's sea port facilities.
 Transit transport agreement to be reviewed every 10 years.
 China to build a regional international airport in Pokhara.
 China, Nepal exploring the possibilities of signing a bilateral free trade agreement.
 China to explore the possibility of finding oil and gas reserves in Nepal.
 China to provide economic and technical support to Nepal to implement the project on Pokhara International airport.
 China to distribute solar panels in Nepal's rural areas by tapping its Climate Fund.
 China to build, manage and maintain Xiarwa Boundary River Bridge at Hilsa, Humla.
 Nepal, China to strengthen intellectual property system in both the countries.
 Nepal, China to extend cooperation and exchange information on banking regulations.

See also
Foreign relations of China
Foreign relations of Nepal

References

Further reading 
 Matteo Miele, British Diplomatic Views on Nepal and the Final Stage of the Ch’ing Empire (1910–1911), Prague Papers on the History of International Relations, Faculty of Arts Press, Charles University, Prague, 1, 2017, pp. 90–101
Mulmi, Amish Raj,  All Roads Lead North:Nepal's Turn to China.India: Westland Books. 2021. ISBN 9789390679096

 
Nepal
Bilateral relations of Nepal